Eberhard IV Nordgau (died December 18, 972/973) was Count of Nordgau. He was the eldest of four children of Hugh III, Count of Nordgau and Hohenburg, and his wife Hildegard.

Biography
He succeeded his father in 940 with his brother Hugues d'Eguisheim.

In 959 he submitted to the Holy Roman Emperor, Otto I at Abbey of Lure.

He governed the Nordgau from 940 until 951, when he abdicated in favour of his son Hugues, and withdrew to his territory of Altorf where he died in 972 / 973.

Marriage and issue
He married Luitgarde, daughter of Wigeric of Lotharingia and Cunegonde. They had the following issue:

 Hugues II of Nordgau, Count of Nordgau
 Adalbert of Alsace
 Hughes, monk at Altorf
 Gérard d'Alsace
 Adelaide, married as first wife to Henry of Speyer, parents to Conrad II, Holy Roman Emperor
 Hedwig married to Siegfried of Luxembourg, parents of St. Cunegonde

Notes and references

Sources

People from Alsace
Date of birth unknown
970s deaths